Susta is a rural municipality located in Parasi District of Lumbini Province of Nepal.

The rural municipality is divided into total 5 wards.

The rural municipality was established on 10 March 2017, fulfilling the requirement of the new constitution of Nepal in 2015, all old municipalities and villages (which were more than 3900 in number) were restructured into 753 new units, thus this RM came into existence.

Kudiya, a portion of Tribenisusta, a big portion of Rupauliya, Narsahi and Pakalihawa Village development committees were incorporated to form this new rural municipality. The headquarters of the municipality is situated at Kudiya.

Background
Soon, the decision was taken to keep it in Lumbini Province under Parasi District but a big portion of Tribenisusta excluded from it and merged to Binayi Tribeni rural municipality of Gandaki Province.

References

Populated places in Parasi District
Rural municipalities in Parasi District
Rural municipalities of Nepal established in 2017